Rhus copallinum  (Rhus copallina is also used but, this is not consistent with the rules of the  International Association for Plant Taxonomy), the winged sumac, shining sumac, dwarf sumac or flameleaf sumac, is a species of flowering plant in the cashew family (Anacardiaceae) that is native to eastern North America.

Description

Shining sumac is often cultivated, where it is well-suited to natural and informal landscapes because it has underground runners which spread to provide dense, shrubby cover for birds and wildlife. This species is valued for ornamental planting because of its lustrous dark green foliage which turns a brilliant orange-red in fall. The fall color display is frequently enjoyed along interstate highways, as the plant readily colonizes these and other disturbed sites. The tiny, greenish-yellow flowers, borne in compact, terminal panicles, are followed by showy red clusters of berries which persist into the winter and attract wildlife.

The flowers are yellow, flowering in the summer.  The fruit attracts birds with no significant litter problem, is persistent on the tree and showy.

The bark is thin and easily damaged from mechanical impact; branches droop as the tree grows, and will require pruning for vehicular or pedestrian clearance beneath the canopy; routinely grown with, or trainable to be grown with, multiple trunks.  The tree wants to grow with several trunks but can be trained to grow with a single trunk.  It has no thorns.

Cultivation and uses

The tree can be planted in a container or above-ground planter. It has been recommended for buffer strips around parking lots or for median strip plantings in the highway, and for land reclamation. Rhus copallinum can tolerate exposure to salt spray in maritime forests and coastal grasslands; it can grow in serpentine soil and shallow, rocky soil.

The tree grows in full sun or part shade. Soil tolerances include clay, loam, sand, slightly alkaline, acidic, and well-drained soil. Its drought tolerance is high.

The somewhat sour berrylike fruits are edible and rich in vitamin A. They are eaten by wildlife and can be made into a lemonade-like drink. Additionally, deer browse the twigs of the species. The leaves make up part of the diets of captive Coquerel's sifakas (lemurs).

References

External links
Bioimages: Rhus copallinum
USDA Plants profile for Rhus copallinum (winged sumac)

copallina
Trees of Cuba
Trees of the Eastern United States
Trees of Ontario
Trees of the Southeastern United States
Plants described in 1753
Taxa named by Carl Linnaeus